The L’Ivrogne River is a river in the Soufrière Quarter  of the island nation of Saint Lucia.  It flows into the L'Ivrogne Bay, Caribbean Sea.

See also
List of rivers of Saint Lucia

References
 

Rivers of Saint Lucia